Cochylis campuloclinium is a species of moth of the family Tortricidae. It is found in Argentina.

The larvae feed on Campuloclinium macrocephalum.

References

Moths described in 2006
Cochylis